Christian Howes may refer to:

 Christian Howes (musician) (born 1972), American musician, educator, and composer
 Christian Howes (presenter) (born 1973), part-time TV presenter, public speaker

See also
Howes (surname)